The 2020 Charlotte 49ers football team represented the University of North Carolina at Charlotte in the 2020 NCAA Division I FBS football season. The 49ers played their home games at Jerry Richardson Stadium in Charlotte, North Carolina, and competed in the East Division of Conference USA (C–USA). They were led by second-year head coach Will Healy.

Previous season
The 49ers finished the 2019 season 7–6, 5–3 in C-USA play to finish in fourth place in the East Division, earning an invite to the program's first bowl game. The 49ers lost 9–31 in the 2019 Makers Wanted Bahamas Bowl to the Buffalo Bulls.

Coaching staff
On December 29, Offensive coordinator Alex Atkins officially left the program to become Offensive line coach at Florida State. On January 22, Quarterbacks coach Mark Carney was promoted to replace Atkins as Offensive coordinator, retaining Quarterbacks responsibilities as well. On February 10 two coaches were added to the 49ers staff to replace outgoing Linebackers coach and Special teams coordinator Max Thurmond. Richmond Defensive coordinator Adam Braithwaite joined the staff to coach Linebackers, and former ODU Running backs and Special teams coordinator Charles Bankins joined to oversee Special Teams. On February 17 Texas A&M alum and Offensive analyst Lee Grimes joined the staff to coach the Offensive line.

Recruiting

Position key

Recruiting class
The following recruits and transfers have signed letters of intent or verbally committed to the Charlotte 49ers football program for the 2020 recruiting year.

Key transfers

Preferred walk-ons

Players

Roster

Depth chart

Awards and honors

Preseason

In season

Postseason

All Conference Honorable Mentions:

Offense:
QB – Chris Reynolds, R-Jr. • 
RB – Aaron McAllister, R-Sr. • 
OL – Jaelin Fisher, R-Sr.

Defense:
DT – Timmy Horne, R-Sr. • 
DE – Romeo McKnight, R-Sr. • 
DE – Tyriq Harris, R-Sr. • 
LB – Tyler Murray, R-Jr. • 
DB – Ben DeLuca, R-Sr.

Special Teams:
P – Conner Bowler, R-Jr.

2021 East–West Shrine Bowl:

Participants:
S - Ben DeLuca •
DE - Romeo McKnight

2021 SPIRAL Tropical Bowl:

Participant:
RB - Tre Harbison

2021 College Gridiron Showcase & Symposium:

Participants:
RB - Aaron McAllister •
OL - Jaelin Fisher

Schedule
Charlotte originally had games scheduled against Norfolk State and Tennessee, which were canceled due to their respective conferences' decisions on the COVID-19 pandemic. The game with Duke was originally scheduled for Thursday September 17 but was moved to Saturday October 31.

On Saturday, August 8, it was announced that the 49ers would play the UNC Chapel Hill Tar Heels on September 19 in Chapel Hill. On August 10, fellow Conference USA member Old Dominion suspended all fall sports, creating another opening on the 49ers' schedule. Appalachian State was added to the schedule on August 12.

On September 14, the home opener against Georgia State was moved from a 6:00 p.m. to a noon start time and also moved from ESPN3 to ESPNU. On September 17, Charlotte announced they had canceled their game at North Carolina scheduled for September 19 due to the impact that contact tracing quarantine has had on a key position group. Several members of the Charlotte offensive line were placed into quarantine following the University's COVID-19 contact tracing protocols, effectively depleting that unit. On September 21 the Conference USA opener against Florida Atlantic was moved from a 6:00 p.m. to 4:00 p.m. start time and also moved from ESPN3 to ESPNU. On Friday, September 25, Georgia State postponed Charlotte's home opener the next day due to contact tracing issues with a player on their team testing positive for COVID-19. ESPNU picked up Charlotte's games against North Texas and the home opener against FIU, moving both games to 8:00 p.m. starting time. On October 15, FIU postponed their game at Charlotte due to COVID-19 contact tracing player availability issues, marking the sixth game lost for the 49ers in the season and the second time that the home opening was delayed.

On November 3 it was announced that Charlotte had added a home game with Gardner-Webb for November 14. On November 4 CUSA rescheduled the previously postponed FIU conference matchup to December 5. On November 6 Charlotte had to postpone its away game with Middle Tennessee after several players had positive COVID-19 tests. On November 13 Gardner-Webb canceled their game for the next day due to COVID-19 cases on their team. Charlotte postponed its game with Marshall on November 16 due to COVID-19 issues on the team. To clear COVID-19 related quarantine issues Charlotte's home game against Western Kentucky was moved to the following Tuesday morning, December 1, 2020 at 10:30 a.m. Charlotte had to postpone the rescheduled game with Western Kentucky on December 1, 2020 due to COVID-19 concerns. Conference USA canceled FIU's postponed game with Charlotte on December 5, 2020 and replaced them with WKU on December 6, 2020. Conference USA rescheduled the Marshall game for December 11, 2020. Marshall canceled the make-up match on December 9, 2020 due to COVID-19 concerns on their team, effectively ending the 49ers season at six games played.

Television
Charlotte 49ers home games and conference road games will be broadcast through Conference USA's television partners ESPN, CBS Sports, and Stadium.

Radio
Radio coverage for all games is broadcast by IMG College through the Charlotte 49ers Radio Network flagship station WZGV ESPN Radio 730 AM The Game, and the TuneIn Charlotte 49ers IMG Sports Network app. The radio announcers are "Voice of the 49ers" Matt Swierad with play-by-play alongside NFL veteran Al Wallace providing color commentary and Bobby Rosinski and Walker Mehl with sideline reports.

Preseason media poll
No Conference USA Preseason Media Poll has been released as of September 2, 2020.

Game summaries

Appalachian State Mountaineers

Sources:

Charlotte would strike first with a Tre Harbison run into the end zone but App would tie the game and then go up a touchdown in the second quarter. Jonathan Cruz would tack on a field goal before the half leaving App with only a four-point lead. The fog and rain would continue to plague both teams in the nearly empty stadium as Cruz would add another field goal late in the third to bring the score difference to a single digit, but on the next series App stretched the lead back out to eight points only to have Charlotte's Aaron McAllister get it back to within a point on a 97-yard kick off return. App would again take their lead out to eight points early in the fourth quarter as Charlotte still couldn't find it's offensive rhythm in the second half. A late touchdown by App made the score difference fifteen points but didn't change the outcome of the game as the 49ers would drop the season opener 20 to 35.

Top performances were dominated by the Mountaineers and included quarterback Zac Thomas who passed for 204 yards and 1 touchdown with 1 interception. Running back Marcus Williams had 14 carries for 117 yards and a touchdown. Receiver Thomas Hennigan had 5 receptions for 120 yards and a touchdown.

Game notes:
 Aaron McAllister's 3rd quarter 97 yard kickoff return set a new program record in that category, topping Mike Hunter's 96-yard return in the Chowan game in 2013.
 McAllister now owns two program records, longest kickoff return and longest run (89 yards at WKU in 2017).
 Game attendance by non-game officials, teams and players was prohibited by the state government due to the COVID-19 pandemic.
 Troy transfer redshirt junior linebacker Tyler Murray capped an impressive debut in Niner green with a Conference USA Defensive Player of the Week Award.
 The ESPN broadcast crew created a minor controversy complaining about the supposed lack of contrasting colors for Charlotte's new away jersey numbers.
 Additional controversy occurred after the game when an Appalachian State assistant coach posed with App. St. players displaying obscene hand gestures while holding a Charlotte related sign. App. St. Head Coach Shawn Clark would call Charlotte Coach Will Healy to offer an apology for the incident.

Florida Atlantic Owls

Sources:

Charlotte would open conference play after two unexpected weeks off visiting their second defending conference champs. Charlotte would go up by 10 points in the 1st quarter, but two long missed field goals by Jonathan Cruz, one in the 2nd quarter and the other off the first drive of the 3rd quarter, would come back to hurt the Niners later. After a scoreless 2nd quarter Charlotte would take a shutout lead into the halftime. Shortly before the halfway point of the 3rd quarter the Owls would finally find the end zone and with under 3 minutes left in the quarter would find it again for their first lead. A Charlotte fumble on the next series would give FAU their third touchdown of the quarter. Early in the 4th quarter Charlotte would get the game into a single score affair again. Charlotte would get into the redzone on the final drive of the game but two sacks of Chris Reynolds would lead to time running out as the Niners would lose 17 to 21.

FAU quarterback Nick Tronti would dominate passing and rushing yards with 98 yards through the air for 2 touchdowns and 10 carries for 94 yards on the ground and a third touchdown. T.J. Chase would have 3 receptions for 31 yards and a touchdown.

Game notes:
First time in the 6-game series that the home team has won.
Chris Reynolds would become the 2nd 49er to cross the 4000 passing yard career mark (4191 yards), second only to Matt Johnson's 5405 passing yards.
Reynolds would become the 2nd Niner to throw for more than 300 yards in a game for the 3rd time (314 yards). Johnson holds the record with 4 games of more than 300 passing yards.
Victor Tucker recorded his 9th career game with more than 100 receiving yards, 2nd all time to Austin Duke who holds the record with 13 100 yard games.

North Texas Mean Green

Sources:

North Texas was looking to avenge their 1-point loss to the 49ers from the previous year, but Charlotte would score on their first possession of the game and lead through to the end of regulation. North Texas would get the game to within a single score in the 2nd quarter, but Charlotte would steadily begin to pull away over the course of the rest of the game despite North Texas putting up substantial numbers behind the scoring combo of Aune and Darden.

North Texas Quarterback Austin Aune passed for 382 yards, 3 touchdowns and an interception. Charlotte rusher Aaron McAllister had 12 carries for 140 yards and a touchdown. The Mean Green's Jaelon Darden had 13 receptions for 244 yards and 3 touchdowns.

Game notes:
 49 points are the most Charlotte has scored against a Conference USA opponent.
 Charlotte also set new conference single game records for touchdowns (7) and total yards of offense (599).
 Aaron McAllister's 140 yard performance moved him into 3rd place all-time in rushing for the 49ers with 1,404 career yards on the ground.
 McAllister's performance earned him the Conference USA Offenisve Player of the Week Award.
 Victor Tucker moved into 2nd place in all-time 49ers receiving yards with 1,798 career yards.

UTEP Miners

Sources:

Charlotte's long delayed home opener finally occurred as the Miners looked to avenge their home loss from the previous season to the "other" pick axe wielding team. Charlotte would strike first but UTEP would flip the lead near the half before Charlotte's late score had both teams tied at the break. The second half didn't get rolling until late in the third quarter when Charlotte would regain the lead. Charlotte would pad their lead with a Jonathan Cruz field goal early in the final quarter. With less than five minutes left in the game both offenses would suddenly come alive in a flurry of five late touchdowns, but their three turnovers in this game would keep the Miners fruitless all-time in the Eastern Time Zone as Charlotte would get the opening home win, 38 to 28.

Top performances of the game include Charlotte's Chris Reynolds, who threw for 185 yards and 2 touchdowns. The 49ers' Aaron McAllister would have 68 yards on 8 carries with 2 touchdowns. UTEP's Justin Garett had 9 receptions for 107 yards and 2 touchdowns.

Game Notes:
 UTEP is now 0-26-1 in the Eastern Time Zone All-time.
 Ben DeLuca's 9 tackles in the game made him the 2nd 49er to cross the 300 career tackles mark, six tackles shy of Jeff Gemmell's record set during the previous season.

Duke Blue Devils

Sources:

Duke scored quickly and often to defend their home field, going up 24 points before Charlotte could answer with their own first touchdown shortly before the half. Duke would continue to trade scores and defend their lead into the fourth quarter when a second scoring explosion from the Blue Devils put the comeback hopes of the 49ers permanently to rest. The final score was Duke 53 to Charlotte's 19.

Top performances for the game included Charlotte's Chris Reynolds, who threw for 171 yards and a touchdown. Duke's Mataeo Durant had 12 carries for 104 yards and 2 touchdowns. The Blue Devil's Jalon Calhoun had 4 receptions for 36 yards and a touchdown.

Game notes:

Charlotte dominated time of possession with the ball in their hands for more than 42 minutes of the game.
The 17-play drive that resulted in Charlotte's first touchdown of the game is the longest drive in program history.
Ben DeLuca's 6 tackles in the game tied him with Jeff Gemmell's 306 tackles for the 49ers all-time tackles record.
Tyler Murray's 8 solo tackles in the game has given him 42 tackles on the season (23 solo tackles).
Markees Watt's sack in this game moved him past 10 career sacks. The only 49ers previously with greater than 10 career sacks are NFL players Alex Highsmith and Larry Ogunjobi.
Chris Reynolds became the first 49er to pass for 1000 yards in three seasons.

Western Kentucky Hilltoppers

Sources:

The game got off to a slow start with the Hilltoppers' Brayden Narveson getting his first of the days' three field goals for himself in the first quarter. Two devastating fumbles to bookend the second quarter would both result in Western Kentucky touchdowns, putting the 49ers in a sizable scoreless hole going into the half. Charlotte would find the endzone early in the third quarter to get on the board, but the Hilltoppers would never look back as they held the lead for the entire game.

Top performances of the game included Charlotte Quarterback Chris Reynolds, who threw for 205 yards and 2 touchdowns. The Hilltoppers' Gaej Walker racked up 98 yards on the ground behind 19 carries. The 49ers' Victor Tucker pulled in 8 receptions for 111 yards.

Game notes:

 Originally scheduled for November 28 but was postponed by Charlotte due to COVID-19 related issues.
 Rescheduled game would also be postponed from December 1 to December 6.
 Ben DeLuca's seven tackles in the game moved him past Jeff Gemmell into the number 1 spot for career tackles with 313.
 Victor Tucker's eight game catches made him the 2nd 2,000 yard career receiver for the 49ers behind Austin Duke.
 Chris Reynolds became the 2nd 49er QB to pass for more than 5,000 yards in his career behind Matt Johnson.
 16 seniors played their final game for the 49ers on this Senior Day.
 First Sunday game in program history.
 First time Charlotte has played a regular season game in the month of December.
 First time Charlotte has had a greater than one week break in playing during a season. In this case five weeks.
 Charlotte did not play for the entirety of the month of November.

Attendance
Due to the loss of the Norfolk State and ODU games Charlotte lost two of their normally six scheduled home games. Due to UNC Charlotte cancelling in-person classes until at least October 1, 2020; it was announced that no attendance would be allowed for the first home game against Georgia State on September 26, 2020. Charlotte's home games were effectively cut in half when Georgia State postponed Charlotte's home opener on September 26 due to contact tracing issues on their team with a COVID-19 positive tested player. With the state government announcement at the beginning of October that large venue gatherings could begin at 7% venue capacity, the 49ers announced that for their two October home games (FIU and UTEP) they would allow a maximum capacity in Jerry Richardson Stadium of 1,047 persons, to be limited to players' and coaches' family members, special guests of the University, and students. Attendance remained limited to 1,047 persons for the rescheduled WKU game in December. Charlotte would finish the season with only two home games both with restricted attendance.

References

Charlotte
Charlotte 49ers football seasons
Charlotte 49ers football